Six national teams qualified to compete in baseball at the 2020 Summer Olympics in Tokyo . As host, Japan automatically qualified. Israel also qualified, by winning the Africa/Europe Qualifying Event in September 2019.

In addition, two teams qualified through the November 2019 WBSC Premier12 tournament. Mexico qualified as the best team from the Americas, and South Korea qualified as the best team from Asia or Oceania (other than already-qualified Japan). The United States qualified by winning the Americas Qualifying Event in early June 2021.

The last spot was awarded to the Dominican Republic, for winning the Final Qualifying Tournament in late June 2021.

Timeline
1 The WBSC Premier12 was played in Japan, Mexico, South Korea, and Taiwan, with the final in Tokyo.

Africa/Europe Qualifying Event

Israel qualified for the Olympics by winning the two-continent qualifying tournament for Europe and Africa. The tournament was a round robin. It was held in Parma and Bologna, Italy, from 18 to 22 September 2019. It featured six teams: the Netherlands, Italy, Spain, Israel, and the Czech Republic (the top five teams in the 2019 European Baseball Championship), and South Africa (the winner of the 2019 African Baseball Championship).

Petr Čech of the Czech Republic led the tournament in batting average (.500), and Danny Valencia of Israel led in runs (7), home runs (3), RBIs (9), walks (5), and slugging percentage (1.000). Pitchers Orlando Yntema of the Netherlands and Joey Wagman of Israel tied for the lead with two wins, and Wagman led in complete games (1) and strikeouts (14).

As the winner of the tournament, Israel qualified to compete in the Tokyo Olympics. The second-place team in the event, the Netherlands, received another qualification opportunity in the Final Qualifying Tournament.

Standings

1 game postponed 4–4 in 6th inning; continued 20 September.

2019 Premier12

The top 12 teams on the WBSC men's baseball ranking list at the end of 2018 qualified for the November 2019 Premier12 competition. Teams from the Americas, Asia, and Oceania were able to qualify for the 2020 Olympics through this tournament. Mexico earned a quota spot as the top finisher from the Americas, and South Korea earned a spot as the top finisher from Asia or Oceania (excluding the already qualified host, Japan).

Final standings

Americas Qualifying Event
The United States won the eight-team Americas Qualifying Event, and was thereby awarded the one quota spot allocated to the winner of the tournament. The teams that finished in second and third place in the event, the Dominican Republic and Venezuela, progressed to the Final Qualifying Tournament.

All six American teams that had competed in the 2019 Premier12 but did not qualify for the Olympics in that tournament received a place at this Qualifying Event. In addition, the event included the top two finishers at the 2019 Pan American Games that did not qualify for the 2019 Premier12.  The event was originally scheduled to be held from 22 to 26 March 2020, in Arizona, but was postponed to 31 May through 5 June in Port St. Lucie and West Palm Beach, Florida, due to the COVID-19 pandemic.

Canada, the Dominican Republic, the US, and Venezuela advanced to the four-team Super Round. Canada came in fourth, and was thus eliminated from possible Olympic qualification.

Jeison Guzman of the Dominican Republic led the tournament in batting average (.571), Julio Rodríguez of the DR led in runs (7), José Bautista of the DR led in walks (6), and Juan Francisco of the DR led in home runs (4) and RBIs (9).

Qualification
2019 Premier12
 
 
 
 
 
 

2019 Pan American Games

Group A

Group B

Super Round

Final Qualifying Tournament
The Dominican Republic, as the winner of the Final Qualifying Tournament in late June 2021 in Mexico, earned the final qualification spot for the 2020 Olympics. Three teams took part. Six teams were originally scheduled to take part: the runner-up from the Africa/Europe Qualifying Event, the runner-up and third-place team from the Americas Qualifying Event, the top two finishers from the 2019 Asian Baseball Championship that had not already qualified for the Olympics, and Australia (which was chosen to represent the Oceania region).

The tournament was originally scheduled to be held from 1 to 5 April 2020 in Taichung and Douliu, Taiwan. It was initially postponed to 17 to 21 June, due to the COVID-19 pandemic. Following the decision to postpone the 2020 Olympic Games to 2021 due to the pandemic, the WBSC again postponed the tournament, this time to from 16 to 20 June 2021 in Taiwan.  In May 2021, due to a spike in domestically transmitted COVID-19 cases in Taiwan and new restrictions imposed by the local government, the WBSC moved the final qualifier to 22 to 26 June 2021, in the city of Puebla, Mexico.

On 7 May 2021, the WBSC announced that China had withdrawn from the competition. Chinese Taipei also withdrew, on 2 June 2021, due to concerns related to player safety from COVID-19 in Mexico, leaving four teams and no Asian representation at the tournament. On 8 June 2021, Australia withdrew from the tournament due to logistical issues caused by COVID-19, leaving just three teams to compete.

Qualification
2020 Americas Qualifying Event
  (runner-up)
  (third place)

2019 Africa/Europe Qualifying Event
  (runner-up)

2019 Asian Baseball Championship

  (winner) (withdrew)
  (third place) (withdrew)

Oceania representative
  (withdrew)

Round robin

Semifinal

Final

See also
Softball at the 2020 Summer Olympics – Qualification

References

Qualification for the 2020 Summer Olympics
Impact of the COVID-19 pandemic on the 2020 Summer Olympics